The 2021 President's Cup was the seventh President's Cup contested for. The match was played on 12 March between the champions of the 2020 League of Ireland Premier Division and 2020 FAI Cup, Shamrock Rovers and Dundalk. The match finished 1–1 after 90 minutes and was decided by a penalty shootout which Dundalk won 4–3 with Albanian goalkeeper Alessio Abibi saving Roberto Lopes penalty to win the game for Dundalk on his competitive debut.

Match

Summary
Sonni Nattestad opened the scoring for Dundalk in the 42nd minute with a downward header after a corner from the left. Five minutes later it was 1-1 when Liam Scales controlled a ball into the penalty area with his right foot, then his left to create space before shooting low to the right corner of the net with his left foot.
Sonni Nattestad was sent-off in the 59th minute following a challenge on Graham Burke.
The game went to penalties with Dundalk goalkeeper Alessio Abibi diving to his left to save the decisive penalty from Roberto Lopes to win the game 4-3.

Details

See also
 2021 League of Ireland Premier Division
 2021 FAI Cup
 2021 Dundalk F.C. season

References

President of Ireland's Cup
2
President Of Ireland's Cup 2021
President Of Ireland's Cup 2021
President of Ireland's Cup